Alain Calmat,  (born 31 August 1940) is a French former competitive figure skater, surgeon, and politician. He is the 1964 Olympic silver medalist, the 1965 World champion, the 1962–1964 European champion, and the 1958 & 1962–1965 French national champion.

Career

Calmat attended the Cours Hattemer, a private school. He started skating at the age of nine. He won the silver medal at the French Figure Skating Championships in 1954 and would go on to win twelve medals at nationals before retiring: seven silver and five gold. He placed 9th at the 1956 Winter Olympics and won the bronze medal at the 1958 European Championships. At the 1960 Winter Olympics, he moved up to sixth place and won the bronze medal at the 1960 World Championships.

The following year, Calmat won the silver medal at the 1961 European Championships. He became European champion for three consecutive years from 1962 to 1964. During that period, Calmat was awarded one bronze and two silver medals at Worlds.

At the 1964 Winter Olympics, Calmat won the silver medal and went on to win his second consecutive silver medal at Worlds. He stayed in one more season and retired as the 1965 World champion.

Calmat carried the torch and lit the Olympic flame at the 1968 Winter Olympics in Grenoble, France.

Competitive highlights

After skating

Calmat later studied medicine, and became a surgeon.

A socialist, he started in a political career. He was minister of Youth Affairs and Sports between 1984 and 1986 when Laurent Fabius was prime minister. He was elected deputy of the département of Cher from 1986 until 1993. In 1995, he became the mayor of Livry-Gargan. In 1997 he became a deputy in the French National Assembly.

Calmat was inducted into the International Jewish Sports Hall of Fame in 1987.

See also

List of Olympic medalists in figure skating
Politics of France
List of select Jewish figure skaters

References

1940 births
Living people
Jewish French sportspeople
French male single skaters
Figure skaters at the 1956 Winter Olympics
Figure skaters at the 1960 Winter Olympics
Figure skaters at the 1964 Winter Olympics
Figure skaters from Paris
Olympic figure skaters of France
Olympic silver medalists for France
Commanders of the Ordre national du Mérite
Chevaliers of the Légion d'honneur
Olympic medalists in figure skating
World Figure Skating Championships medalists
European Figure Skating Championships medalists
Medalists at the 1964 Winter Olympics
Olympic cauldron lighters
Universiade medalists in figure skating
Universiade gold medalists for France
Medalists at the 1960 Winter Universiade
French sportsperson-politicians